Waziristan campaign or Waziristan expedition may refer to:

Waziristan campaign (1919–20)
Waziristan campaign (1921–24)
Waziristan campaign (1936–39)
Waziristan War, the 2004–present conflict in North-West Pakistan